Fariborz Arabnia (born 28 April 1963 in Tehran) is an Iranian actor and director.

Filmography
Wild Deer (1990)
Contact Good (1991)
Mosaferan (1991)
Eclipse (1992)
I love the Earth (1993)
The 5th man (1994)
Kakadow (1995)
Restlessness years (1995)
Scent of Life (1995)
Deadly Escape (1995)
The Feast (1996)
Sultan (1996)
Higher risk (1997)
Artery (1997)
World Champion, Takhti (1998)
Tootia (1998)
Shokaran (1998)
Win Dawn (1999)
Delbakhteh (2000)
Bitter Almonds (2000)
Hafth-Pardeh (2000)
Thousands of Women like Me (2000)
Gaga (2000)
The colors of Night (2001)
Thirst (2002)
Lead stars (2003)
A Girl in a Cage (2004)
Butterfly in the Wind (2004)
Bargaining (2004)
Bajkhor (2004)
Free Peacock Feathers (2008)
Empty Seats (2008)
Hot chocolate (2010)
Earth and fire (2011)
Secret (2011)
Blood Oranges (2011)
Che (2013)
 Gaahi [Sometimes] (2015)
 When did You See Sahar Last Time? (2015)

TV series
Vakil (1996–97)
Mokhtarnameh (2004–08)

Controversy
He criticized Iranian cinema and television in a live program Haft (Seven) that was not supported by film directors, actors and actress. As well, when he found differences with Ebrahim Hatamikia, he left and refuse to continue in his film, Ch that forced Hatamikia to use an lieu for his rule.

References

1964 births
Living people
People from Tehran
Iranian film directors
Male actors from Tehran
Iranian male film actors
Iranian expatriates in Turkey
Iranian male television actors